A Tight Corner is a 1932 British comedy film directed by Leslie S. Hiscott and starring Frank Pettingell, Gina Malo, Betty Astell and Charles Stratton. It was made at Twickenham Studios as a quota quickie for release by MGM.

Cast
 Harold French as Tony Titmouse  
 Frank Pettingell as Oswald Blenkinsop  
 Gina Malo 
 Betty Astell
 Charles Stratton
 Madeleine Gibson as Woman

References

Bibliography
 Chibnall, Steve. Quota Quickies: The Birth of the British 'B' Film. British Film Institute, 2007.
 Low, Rachael. Filmmaking in 1930s Britain. George Allen & Unwin, 1985.
 Wood, Linda. British Films, 1927-1939. British Film Institute, 1986.

External links
 

1932 films
British comedy films
1932 comedy films
British black-and-white films
Films directed by Leslie S. Hiscott
Quota quickies
Films shot at Twickenham Film Studios
1930s English-language films
1930s British films